Al-Naseriyah is a Syrian village in the Al-Qutayfah District of the Rif Dimashq Governorate. According to the Syria Central Bureau of Statistics (CBS), Al-Naseriyah had a population of 4,827 in the 2004 census.

References

External links

Populated places in Al-Qutayfah District